The following is an overview of 2020 in Chinese music. Music in the Chinese language (Mandarin and Cantonese) and artists from Chinese-speaking countries (Mainland China, Hong Kong, Taiwan, Malaysia, and Singapore) will be included.

TV shows
chuang 2020 (May 2 – July 4)
Sing! China (season 5) (August 21 – November 21)
Singer (season 8) (February 7 – April 24)
Youth With You (season 3) (February 18 – May 1)

Awards
2020 Chinese Music Awards
2020 Chinese Top Ten Music Awards
2020 Global Chinese Golden Chart Awards
2020 Midi Music Awards
2020 Migu Music Awards
2020 MTV Europe Music Awards Best Chinese and Hong Kong Act: R1SE

Releases

March

June

July

References

2020 in Chinese music
2020 in music